Husbysjøen is a village in the municipality of Indre Fosen in Trøndelag county, Norway. It was the administrative centre of the former municipality of Stjørna prior to its merger into neighboring Rissa municipality in 1964.

The village is located along the Sørfjorden, an arm of the Stjørnfjorden. Just north of the village is the Ramsvik Church.

References

Villages in Trøndelag
Indre Fosen